Wirges is a Verbandsgemeinde ("collective municipality") in the district Westerwaldkreis, in Rhineland-Palatinate, Germany. The seat of the Verbandsgemeinde is in Wirges.

The Verbandsgemeinde Wirges consists of the following Ortsgemeinden ("local municipalities"):

 Bannberscheid 
 Dernbach 
 Ebernhahn 
 Helferskirchen 
 Leuterod 
 Mogendorf 
 Moschheim 
 Niedersayn 
 Ötzingen 
 Siershahn 
 Staudt 
 Wirges

Verbandsgemeinde in Rhineland-Palatinate